In mathematics, the Deuring–Heilbronn phenomenon, discovered by  and ,  states that a counterexample to the generalized Riemann hypothesis for one Dirichlet L-function affects the location of the zeros of other Dirichlet L-functions.

See also 

 Siegel zero

References

Analytic number theory